The Strengthen the Arm of Liberty Monument in Fayetteville, Arkansas, is a replica of the Statue of Liberty (Liberty Enlightening the World). It was placed by the Boy Scouts of America as part of its 1950s-era campaign, "Strengthen the Arm of Liberty".

It is located in front of Washington Regional Medical Center on North Hills Blvd.

The statue was removed from the National Register of Historic Places in 2012 when it was improperly moved to its new location, but was later relisted.

See also

Scouting museums
Scouting memorials
National Register of Historic Places listings in Washington County, Arkansas

References

External links

Replica Statue of Liberty Search
nationalregisterofhistoricplaces.com

1950 sculptures
Monuments and memorials on the National Register of Historic Places in Arkansas
National Register of Historic Places in Fayetteville, Arkansas
Outdoor sculptures in Arkansas
Fayetteville, Arkansas
Sculptures of women in Arkansas
Statues in Arkansas
1950 establishments in Arkansas